Letymvou (or Letymbou) is a village in the Paphos District of Cyprus, located 12 km north of Paphos. It's located 383m above sea level.  It receives 620 mm of rainfall annually.  From a transport view, Letymbou is connected with the village Kourdaka in the east (about 3, 5 km) with the village Pitargou in the south east (about 3 km) and with the village Kallepia in the south west (about 2 km).

Climate
The climate is warm and temperate in Letymvou. The rain in Letymvou falls mostly in the winter, with relatively little rain in the summer. This climate is considered to be Csa according to the Köppen-Geiger climate classification. The average annual temperature in Letymvou is 17.5 °C.

References

Communities in Paphos District